Minsk is an aircraft carrier (heavy aircraft cruiser in Russian classification) that served the Soviet Navy and the Russian Navy from 1978 to 1994. She was the second  vessel to be built.

From 2000 to 2016 she was a theme park known as Minsk World in Shatoujiao, Yantian, Shenzhen, China.

In April 2016, Minsk was towed to Jiangsu for exhibition.

History

Russian service

Named after the capital city of Belarus, Minsk was laid down in 1972, launched on 30 September 1975, completed on 27 September 1978, and decommissioned on 30 June 1993.

Minsk operated with the Pacific Fleet. Shortly after the Sino-Vietnamese War of 1979, Minsk was deployed to the South China Sea, making a port of call at Cam Ranh Bay, Vietnam, in September 1980. She visited Vietnam again in 1982 during her second deployment before sailing onto the Indian Ocean. In 1984, Minsk, the  landing ship Aleksandr Nikolayev, and Vietnam forces conducted the Soviet Navy's first amphibious landing in Vietnam.

Soviet cosmonaut Oleg Grigoriyevich Kononenko survived an aircraft ejection on the Minsk in 1979. On September 8, 1980, he was killed in the crash of a Yakovlev Yak-38 VTOL fighter on the Minsk.

The carrier was retired as a result of a major accident (details not known) which required the facilities at the Chernomorskiy yard, in Mykolayiv, located in the newly independent Ukraine (the reasons for not attempting a repair are not known).

Shenzhen Minsk World, China

In 1995 Minsk was sold for scrap to a South Korean company. Due to protests from South Korean environmentalists, the ship was resold to the Chinese state-owned Guangdong Ship Dismantling Company. The ship was again saved from the scrapyard when a group of Chinese video-game arcade owners formed the Shenzhen Minsk Investment Company to buy the ship for $4.3 million.

Minsk became the centerpiece of a military theme park in Yantian district, Shatoujiao (沙头角) sub-district, Shenzhen called Minsk World. However, the Shenzhen Minsk company went bankrupt in 2006, and the carrier was put up for auction on 22 March 2006. On 31 May 2006, the carrier was sold in Shenzhen for 128 million RMB to CITIC Shenzhen.

The ship was again sold to Dalian Yongjia Group, a real estate company in Dalian in North China, on 1 January 2013. On 3 April 2016, Chinese news reported the aircraft carrier had been towed to a new destination, Zhoushan for refit, because of the decline of the number of tourists after 2006.

After the refit is completed, the ship is to be taken to Nantong on the Yangtse River in Jiangsu Province and moored to the west of Sutong Yangtze River Bridge as part of a new theme park which was planned to open in 2017. As of 2018, the project is delayed.

See also

 List of aircraft carriers of Russia and the Soviet Union

References

External links
 "Bids fall short for ex-Soviet aircraft carrier"
 MaritimeQuest Minsk pages
 Satellite Photo of Minsk in the military theme park in Shenzhen from Google Maps

Kiev-class aircraft carriers
Ships built at the Black Sea Shipyard
1975 ships
Cold War aircraft carriers of the Soviet Union
Museums in Jiangsu
Museum ships in China
Ships built in the Soviet Union